VeggieTales in the House is an American computer-animated children's comedy streaming television series developed by Doug TenNapel (of Earthworm Jim fame) and produced by Big Idea Entertainment (owned by DreamWorks Classics), and animated by Bardel Entertainment. It picks up after VeggieTales, a Christian-themed video and film series, featuring anthropomorphic vegetables.

Characters

Main
 Bob the Tomato (voiced by  Phil Vischer) – One of the main characters of VeggieTales, he is best friends and roommates with Larry the Cucumber and acts as the "straight man" to Larry. He works part-time at Pa Grape's store doing various jobs and tasks. 
 Larry the Cucumber (voiced by Mike Nawrocki) – Best friends and roommate with Bob the Tomato, Larry is scatterbrained and has a silly personality. He works driving the town's ice-cream cart and does odd jobs at Pa Grape's store. He secretly protects the city from crime as the superhero LarryBoy.
 Petunia Rhubarb (voiced by Tress MacNeille) – Good friends with Bob, Larry, and Tina Celerina. She often enjoys hanging out with them and often offers them advice whenever they get into a fight or face personal problems. After working at Pa Grape's store, she opened her own flower shop.
 Laura Carrot (voiced by Tress MacNeille) – A young carrot who is friends with Bob and Larry and Junior Asparagus, her best friend. She eventually gained a superheroine alter ego dubbed "Night Pony" and helps fight crime with LarryBoy and other superheroes.
 Junior Asparagus (voiced by Tress MacNeille) – Best friends with Laura, Junior is a typical child and looks up to Larry. Like Larry, he also has a superhero alter ego, "Junior Jetpack," using a jet pack given to him by Ichabeezer.
 Pa Grape (voiced By Phil Vischer) – A wise old grape, he runs a convenience store called Pa's Corner Store. He often provides wise and insightful advice to his friends and customers. 
 Jimmy and Jerry Gourd (voiced by Phil Vischer and Mike Nawrocki) - Brothers that live together in an apartment not far from Bob and Larry's house. They don't do much, but they love to eat. Jimmy also gained a superhero alter ego by the name of JimmyBoy and is being trained under the wing of LarryBoy.
 Ichabeezer (voiced by Rob Paulsen) – Ichabeezer is a grumpy, gruff and elderly zucchini who doesn't get along with the other veggies. For the Netflix era, he has essentially assumed Mr. Nezzer's role as an outsider/villain foil for Bob and Larry.

Recurring
 Jean-Claude and Phillipe Pea (voiced by Mike Nawrocki and Phil Vischer) – The brothers are peas with French accents.
 Madame Blueberry (voiced by Tress MacNeille) – A female blueberry with a British accent. She lives in a blue, teapot-shaped house, where she spends most of her time drinking tea and enjoying the "fancier" things in life.
 Mr. Lunt (voiced by Phil Vischer) – A gourd who works around town and sells various items, often joking that his job changes every episode. He eventually sets up his own place of business, where he can be seen doing various odd jobs. Carrying on from the original videos, his lack of eyes is a running gag throughout the show.
 Archibald Asparagus (voiced by Phil Vischer) – The Mayor of the town with an upper-crust British accent. He enjoys being the mayor and leader of the town, but more often than not, he can be overwhelmed by the amount of work he does. He often acts as a judge/impartial third party when something goes wrong.
 Bacon Bill (voiced by Rob Paulsen) – An eccentric genius who is the son of one of Pa Grape's friends. He looks up to Larry as an older brother figure. 
 Lil’ Pea (voiced by Kel Mitchell) - A pea who's the son of Dad Pea
 Tina Celerina (voiced by Tress MacNeille) – Petunia's best friend and employee of her flower shop.
 Motato (voiced by Rob Paulsen) – An evil, deformed Sweet Potato who is LarryBoy's chief nemesis. Along with his radish minions, he carries out various nefarious plots to destroy the town. He is the series' main antagonist.
 Radishes (voiced by Phil Vischer and Mike Nawrocki) - Evil minions of Motato.
 Callie Flower (voiced by Tress MacNeille) - A cauliflower who is a classmate of Junior Asparagus.
 Mike Asparagus (voiced by Rob Paulsen) - Junior Asparagus' astronaut dad.
 Lisa Asparagus (voiced by Tress MacNeille) - Junior Asparagus' mom.
 Tom Celeriac (voiced by Rob Paulsen) - A mustachioed celery root movie star.

Episodes

Production 
The series was executive produced by TenNapel, creator of Earthworm Jim and Catscratch. The series was released to Netflix on November 26, 2014. The show lasted for three years before ending in 2016. A follow-up series, titled VeggieTales in the City, was released on February 24, 2017, but ended by September 2017.

The two creators of the traditional VeggieTales series from 1993 reprise their voices of the characters: Phil Vischer reprises the voices of Bob the Tomato, Archibald Asparagus, Jimmy Gourd, Phillipe Pea, Mr. Lunt, and Pa Grape and Mike Nawrocki reprises the voices of Larry the Cucumber, Jerry Gourd, and Jean-Claude Pea. Other characters on the show (including the rest of the original characters brought over from the original VeggieTales series) are voiced by Tress MacNeille as Petunia Rhubarb, Madame Blueberry, Laura Carrot, and Junior Asparagus, Rob Paulsen, who provides the voice of Ichabeezer and two new characters named Bacon Bill and Motato, Maurice LaMarche, and Kel Mitchell, among others.

The series was removed from Netflix on September 23, 2022, six years after the release of the fourth and final season. Despite this, VeggieTales in the City is still available on the service as of September 2022.

Reception 
Despite receiving positive reviews from critics, the series was criticized by some for the redesigns of the characters and superficial Christian messages. Viewership of both the series and its follow-up on Netflix were significantly lower than the viewership of the original series, and was eventually cancelled in March 2018, before a revival of the series titled The VeggieTales Show was announced.

Home media
Big Idea Entertainment have released only two DVD volumes of VeggieTales in the House. Each release contained seven episodes from the first season, and one episode from the second season.

References

External links

VeggieTales
2014 American television series debuts
2016 American television series endings
2010s American animated television series
2010s American children's comedy television series
American children's animated comedy television series
American children's animated education television series
American children's animated fantasy television series
American computer-animated television series
Christian children's television series
Television series created by Doug TenNapel
Television series by DreamWorks Animation
Christian animation
Big Idea Entertainment television series
English-language Netflix original programming
Netflix children's programming
American sequel television series